Uberaba–Mário de Almeida Franco Airport  is the airport serving Uberaba, Brazil.

During a transitional period, the airport is jointly operated by Infraero and AENA.

History
Uberaba–Mário de Almeida Franco Airport was founded on May 23, 1935 and originally named after Alberto Santos-Dumont. On June 13, 1980 the name was changed to Mário de Almeida Franco.

Previously operated by Infraero, on August 18, 2022 the consortium AENA won a 30-year concession to operate the airport.

Airlines and destinations

Access

See also

List of airports in Brazil

References

External links

Airports in Minas Gerais
Airports established in 1935